Pitcairnia bergii is a species of plant in the family Bromeliaceae. It is endemic to Ecuador, where it is known from only two subpopulations in El Oro Province. It grows in the forests of the lower Andes, where it is threatened by habitat destruction.

References

bergii
Endangered plants
Endemic flora of Ecuador
Taxonomy articles created by Polbot